Serdar Eylik (born 1 February 1990) is a Turkish professional footballer who plays as a winger for Amed.

Early life and club career
Eylik was born in Elazığ, while his parents were originally from Kars. The family later moved to Istanbul while Eylik was a year old. Eylik joined Galatasaray's youth academy as a ten-year-old in 2000. He was inspired to play football by his uncle, a semi-professional footballer. On 14 October 2008, Eylik put pen to paper on his first professional contract. Eylik scored eight goals in 48 matches playing in the A2 league. He made his professional debut against FC Tobol in the 2009–10 UEFA Europa League. His league debut came against Sivasspor on 1 November 2009. During the winter break, Eylik was loaned out to Orduspor, netting two goals in 14 TFF First League matches during the second half of the season. Eylik was again loaned out, this time to Denizlispor on 14 July 2010.

International career
Eylik was first called up to international play at the under-17 level in 2007. He has also played for Turkey at the U-18, U-19, U-20, and U-21 levels.

References

External links
 

1990 births
People from Elazığ
Living people
Turkish footballers
Turkey youth international footballers
Turkey under-21 international footballers
Association football midfielders
Galatasaray A2 footballers
Galatasaray S.K. footballers
Orduspor footballers
Denizlispor footballers
Karşıyaka S.K. footballers
Giresunspor footballers
Kayseri Erciyesspor footballers
Ankaraspor footballers
Samsunspor footballers
Şanlıurfaspor footballers
Sarıyer S.K. footballers
Hatayspor footballers
Tokatspor footballers
Nazilli Belediyespor footballers
Ankara Demirspor footballers
Süper Lig players
TFF First League players
TFF Second League players
TFF Third League players